Theodore Cotillo Barbarossa (1906–1992) was an American sculptor active primarily in New York City, Washington, D.C., and Boston.

Barbarossa was born in Ludlow, Vermont, and studied at the Massachusetts College of Art and Yale University. He then became a sculptor in New York City, lived for a time in Belmont, Massachusetts and Alton, New Hampshire, and died at the Lahey Clinic in Burlington, Massachusetts.

Barbarossa was a fellow of the National Sculpture Society, and a member of the National Academy of Design, the Allied Artists of America, and the Audubon Artists.

Image Library

Selected works 
 Arlington, Massachusetts - The Uncle Sam Memorial Statue (1976)
 Cathedral of the Assumption of the Blessed Virgin Mary, Baltimore, Maryland
 Cathedral of St. John the Divine, New York City
 Museum of Science facade, Boston, Massachusetts - Five Carved Stone Panels
 National Academy of Design, New York City - Saint Sebastian
 National Shrine of the Immaculate Conception, Washington, D.C. - Pope Pius X, (1961–1962)
 1939 New York World's Fair
 Saint Thomas Church (New York City)
 Sumner Street Elderly Housing, Heritage House, Boston, Massachusetts - Commemorative Relief of Noddle Island
 Washington Cathedral - Baptism of Christ, 1968; The Three Wisemen, 1968; Who For Our Salvation - Christ Saving Peter from Drowning, (1969)

References

External links 
 Smithsonian - SIRIS Art Inventories
 Smithsonian - Barbarossa archive
 Boston Globe obituary, 2/17/1992

1906 births
Yale University alumni
Massachusetts College of Art and Design alumni
1992 deaths
20th-century American sculptors
20th-century American male artists
American male sculptors
Treasury Relief Art Project artists
People from Ludlow (town), Vermont
People from Belmont, Massachusetts
People from Alton, New Hampshire